The 2022 General Tire 150 was the second stock car race of the 2022 ARCA Menards Series, the first race of the 2022 ARCA Menards Series West and the 2022 Sioux Chief Showdown, and the third iteration of the event. The race was held on Friday, March 11, 2022, in Avondale, Arizona at Phoenix Raceway, a 1-mile (1.6 km) permanent low-banked tri-oval race track. The race was run over 154 laps due to an overtime finish. Taylor Gray of David Gilliland Racing would win the race after leading 43 laps. This was Gray's first career ARCA Menards Series win and his fourth career west series win. It was an emotional win, as Gray dedicated it to Steven Stotts, the DGR hauler driver who was killed following an accident in Longview, Texas, on March 8. To fill out the podium, Daniel Dye of GMS Racing and Sammy Smith of Kyle Busch Motorsports would finish 2nd and 3rd, respectively.

Background 
Phoenix Raceway is a 1-mile, low-banked tri-oval race track located in Avondale, Arizona, near Phoenix. The motorsport track opened in 1964 and currently hosts two NASCAR race weekends annually. Phoenix Raceway has also hosted the CART, IndyCar Series, USAC and the WeatherTech SportsCar Championship. The raceway is currently owned and operated by NASCAR.

Entry list 

 **Withdrew prior to the event.

Practice/Qualifying 
Practice and qualifying will both be combined into one 60-minute session, with a driver's fastest time counting as their qualifying time. The session was held on Friday, March 11, at 2:00 PM MST.

Race results

Standings after the race 

Drivers' Championship standings

Note: Only the first 10 positions are included for the driver standings.

References 

2022 ARCA Menards Series
NASCAR races at Phoenix Raceway
General Tire 150 (Phoenix)
General Tire 150 (Phoenix)
2022 ARCA Menards Series West